The Kachanivsky oil field is a Ukrainian oil field that was discovered in 1961. It began production in 1962 and produces oil.

References

Oil fields in Ukraine
Oil fields of the Soviet Union